Vaginularia is a genus of ferns in the subfamily Vittarioideae of the family Pteridaceae in the Pteridophyte Phylogeny Group classification of 2016 (PPG I). Other sources sink the genus into Monogramma, a genus not recognized in PPG I.

Species
, the Checklist of Ferns and Lycophytes of the World recognized the following species:
Vaginularia acrocarpa Holttum
Vaginularia capillaris (Copel.) C.Chr.
Vaginularia emarginata (Brause) Goebel
Vaginularia junghuhnii Mett.
Vaginularia paradoxa (Fée) Mett.
Vaginularia subfalcata (Hook.) C.Chr.
Vaginularia trichoidea Fée

References

Pteridaceae
Fern genera
Taxa named by Antoine Laurent Apollinaire Fée